Channel 2 was a Syrian television channel launched on 13 March 1985. It has different schedules for different governorates. It has a sport, family and health focus within its regional variants. The channel can only be seen in Syria. Channel 2 was shut down in 2012.

References

Arabic-language television stations
Television channels in Syria
Television channels and stations established in 1985
1985 establishments in Syria
Television channels and stations disestablished in 2012
2012 disestablishments in Syria
State media